Ferdiansyah may refer to:

 Ferdiansyah (footballer, born 1983), Indonesian association football player
 Ferdiansyah (footballer, born 2000), Indonesian association football player